Acme motorcycle may refer to:

 Acme motorcycle (1911–13)
 Acme motorcycle (1915–17)
 Acme motorcycle (1939–49)